Thomasia quercifolia, commonly known as oak leaved thomasia, is a flowering plant in the family Malvaceae and is endemic to the south-west of Western Australia. It has egg-shaped, lobed leaves with a heart-shaped base, and pink to mauve flowers.

Description
The leaves usually have 5 lobes, the lobes often further or toothed. Both surfaces of the leaves are covered with star-shaped hairs, more densely so on the lower surface. The sepals are pink to mauve with a few coarse hairs. Flowering occurs from 
August to December.

Taxonomy and naming
The species was first formally described by botanist Henry Cranke Andrews in The Botanist's Repository for New and Rare Plants in 1806.  He gave it the name Lasiopetalum quercifolium  Jaques Étienne Gay transferred the species to the genus Thomasia in 1861 as Thomasia quercifolia.The specific epithet (quercifolia) means "oak leaved".

Distribution and habitat
Oak leaved thomasia grows in coastal heath over limestone near the south coast of Western Australia, between the Walpole-Nornalup National Park and Bremer Bay in the Jarrah Forest and Warren bioregions of south-western Western Australia.

Conservation status
Thomasia quercifolia is listed as "Priority Four" by the Government of Western Australia Department of Biodiversity, Conservation and Attractions, meaning that it is rare or near threatened.

References

Rosids of Western Australia
Plants described in 1806
quercifolia
Taxa named by Henry Cranke Andrews